The Night Mayor is a 1932 American pre-Code drama film directed by Benjamin Stoloff and starring Lee Tracy, Evalyn Knapp and Don Dillaway.

Cast
 Lee Tracy as Mayor Bobby Kingston 
 Evalyn Knapp as Doree Dawn 
 Don Dillaway as Fred Field 
 Eugene Pallette as Hymie Shane 
 Vince Barnett as Louis Mossbaum, Tailor 
 Warren Hymer as Riley 
 Astrid Allwyn as Patsy 
 Barbara Weeks as Nutsy 
 Gloria Shea as Gwen

uncredited performers
Wade Boteler as Grogan
Wallis Clark as Crandall
Emmett Corrigan as Lt. Governor Robertson
Eddie Foster as Reporter
Sherry Hall as Bill
Eddie Kane as Larry Sigmund
Frank McLure as Ritz Hotel Waiter
Harold Minjir as Ashley Sparks
Edmund Mortimer as Dignitary
Tom O'Brien as Delaney
Larry Steers as Mayor's Attendee

References

Bibliography
 Palmer, Scott. British Film Actors' Credits, 1895-1987. McFarland, 1998.

External links
 

1932 films
1932 drama films
American drama films
Films directed by Benjamin Stoloff
Columbia Pictures films
1930s English-language films
1930s American films